The Campbell House is a historic house at 714 West Third Street in Rogers, Arkansas.  It is a two-story L-shaped wood-frame structure with clapboard siding.  Its corners are beveled, with overhanging gable corners above, and decorative woodwork in the gable ends above.  The entry porch, in the crook of the L, is supported by turned columns with a spindled latticework frieze.  The house is a fine local example of Eastlake architecture.

The house was listed on the National Register of Historic Places in 1988.

See also
National Register of Historic Places listings in Benton County, Arkansas

References

Houses on the National Register of Historic Places in Arkansas
Queen Anne architecture in Arkansas
Houses completed in 1893
Houses in Rogers, Arkansas
National Register of Historic Places in Benton County, Arkansas